Cristian Imparato (born February 24, 1996) is an Italian singer best known for winning the first edition of the talent show hosted by Gerry Scotti, Io Canto.

Career
When he was young, he sang on the Sicily balcony of his house as the neighbors listened. Cristian had never taken voice or music lessons until the day his older brother made him go to the Mediaset program Io Canto's auditions. He was accepted and went on to the finale, in which he won a trip to study in the United States with David Foster.

References

External links 

 

1996 births
Living people
Musicians from Palermo
21st-century Italian male singers